David S. Blitzer (born September 7, 1969) is an American businessman. He is an executive at Blackstone Group and co-founder of Harris Blitzer Sports & Entertainment. He is or has been a co-managing partner and minority owner of the New Jersey Devils of the National Hockey League, Philadelphia 76ers of the National Basketball Association, Cleveland Guardians of Major League Baseball, Crystal Palace F.C. of the English Premier League, FC Augsburg of the Bundesliga, ADO Den Haag of the Keuken Kampioen Divisie, Waasland-Beveren of the Belgian Jupiler Pro League, Real Salt Lake of Major League Soccer, the Scranton Wilkes/Barre RailRiders of the Triple-A International League, Brøndby IF of the Danish Superliga, and Esports company Dignitas.

Biography
Blitzer grew up in Scotch Plains, New Jersey, and is Jewish. In 1987, he graduated from Scotch Plains-Fanwood High School. He graduated magna cum laude from the University of Pennsylvania in 1991. He is married to fellow Penn alumnus Allison Ross. In 1991, he accepted a position with the Blackstone Group where he currently serves as senior managing director & global head of tactical opportunities in New York City.

Blitzer is a member of the investment group that won a $280 million bid for the purchase of the Philadelphia 76ers. The other members of the investment group are: Joshua Harris of the private equity firm Apollo Global Management, portfolio manager Art Wrubel, and former NBA agent and Sacramento Kings executive Jason Levien, all fellow Wharton School of the University of Pennsylvania graduates,  as well as former Vail Resorts CEO Adam Aron, Martin J. Geller, David B. Heller, Travis Hennings, James Lassiter, Marc Leder, Michael Rubin, Will Smith & Jada Pinkett Smith, and Indonesian businessmen Handy Soetedjo & Erick Thohir. Comcast-Spectacor and Harris began talks in the summer of 2011.  The deal was announced on July 13, 2011.  The NBA formally approved the deal on October 13. As of October 2022, the value of the Sixers has increased to $3.15 billion.

On August 15, 2013, it was announced that a group led by Joshua Harris and partner David Blitzer have purchased a majority stake in the New Jersey Devils of the NHL, which includes the rights to operate Prudential Center arena in Newark, New Jersey. The transaction was reportedly for over $320 million. In 2017, Blitzer and Harris formed Harris Blitzer Sports & Entertainment (HBSE) which holds their sports investments. As of December 2022, the value of the Devils had increased to $960 million.

In September 2014, he partnered with David Abrams and lead a local investment group that purchased a 50% interest the New York Yankees Triple-A affiliate, the Scranton/Wilkes-Barre RailRiders; Blitzer and Abrams will serve as co-managing owners. In December 2015, Blitzer and Harris joined with Steve Parish to a take a controlling stake in Crystal Palace F.C.

In September 2016, Blitzer and Harris purchased Dignitas, a professional esports organization based in the United Kingdom formed when Battlefield 1942 clans Legion Condor and Sweden Kompanix merged. It best known for its former League of Legends and Counter-Strike: Global Offensive squads.

In January 2022, Blitzer partnered with Ryan Smith's Smith Entertainment Group (SEG) to purchase Major League Soccer team Real Salt Lake.

On June 16, 2022, Major League Baseball approved Blitzer's purchase of a minority share of the Cleveland Guardians baseball team. Blitzer purchased a 25 percent stake of the team for a six-year term, with an eventual option to purchase enough of the team to be a majority owner.

Philanthropy
Blitzer and his wife founded the Blitzer Family Foundation which promotes youth development through education, athletics, and health. Blitzer serves on the Boards of Dream, a youth development organizing servicing more than 2,200 inner city children, the Riverdale Country School, the advisory board of the Mount Sinai Hospital Surgical Department, the Board of Advisors at the Wharton School, and the board of trustees at the University of Pennsylvania. Blitzer is a supporter of Hillel, which focuses on encouraging Jewish undergraduate and graduate students to embrace their Jewish heritage.

Personal life
Blitzer is married to Allison (née Ross) Blitzer, who is also Jewish; they have five children.

In 2010, his father-in-law, Stuart Ross, who once owned the North American rights to the Smurfs franchise, was convicted of trying to extort $5.5 million from Blitzer in return for having no more contact with Blitzer's family and another $5.5 million from Blitzer for having no more contact with Blitzer and Blackstone. He was convicted of extortion and sentenced to five years of probation under the condition that he get psychiatric and alcohol treatment and has no contact with his daughter Allison, Blitzer, their children, and the Blackstone Group.

References

1969 births
Living people
American business executives
American financiers
The Blackstone Group people
New Jersey Devils executives
People from Scotch Plains, New Jersey
Philadelphia 76ers owners
Scotch Plains-Fanwood High School alumni
Sportspeople from Union County, New Jersey
Jewish American sportspeople
Wharton School of the University of Pennsylvania alumni
21st-century American Jews
American soccer chairmen and investors
Chairmen and investors of football clubs in England
Chairmen and investors of soccer clubs in the United States
Real Salt Lake owners